Sir John Chevallier Hoskyns, 15th Baronet (23 May 1926 – 12 April 1956) was an English first-class cricketer, British Army officer, barrister, and clergyman.

The son of Sir Edwyn Hoskyns, he was born in May 1926 at Newnham, Cambridgeshire. He was educated at Marlborough College. Upon the death of his brother in April 1945, he succeeded him as the 15th Baronet of the Hoskyns baronets. He finished his education at Marlborough during the Second World War and was commissioned into the King's Royal Rifle Corps as a second lieutenant in September 1945, and was posted to Palestine and Kenya until 1948.

After returning to England, Hoskyns matriculated to King's College, Cambridge. While studying at Cambridge, he played first-class cricket for Cambridge University Cricket Club in 1949, making two appearances against Sussex and Warwickshire. He scored 63 runs in his two matches, with a highest score of 42 not out. In addition to playing cricket for Cambridge, Hoskyns also captained the university field hockey team. While at Cambridge he remained commissioned in the army. In April 1951 he was promoted to lieutenant, and was simultaneously made a temporary captain. A member of the Inner Temple, he was called to the bar to practice as a barrister in 1951, where he practiced on the Middle Circuit. During this time he lived in East London and in his spare time ran a boys' club. Hoskyns gave up his legal practice in 1954 to take holy orders. He died without issue in April 1956 at Powick, Worcestershire and was succeeded as the 16th Baronet by his brother, Sir Benedict Hoskyns.

References

External links

1926 births
1956 deaths
People from Cambridge
People educated at Marlborough College
Baronets in the Baronetage of England
King's Royal Rifle Corps officers
British Army personnel of World War II
Alumni of King's College, Cambridge
English cricketers
Cambridge University cricketers
Members of the Inner Temple
English barristers
20th-century English Anglican priests